Westland or Westlands may refer to:

Places
Westlands, an affluent neighbourhood in the city of Nairobi, Kenya
Westlands, Staffordshire, a suburban area and ward in Newcastle-under-Lyme
Westland, a peninsula of the Shetland Mainland near Vaila, Scotland

Netherlands 
Westland, Netherlands (disambiguation)
Westland (municipality), Netherlands 
Westland (region), Netherlands

New Zealand 
Westland District, a political subdivision on the West Coast of New Zealand's South Island
Westland Tai Poutini National Park, a national park
Informally, the name often used for the entire West Coast region, of which the Westland District is a part 
Westland (New Zealand electorate) a former parliamentary electorate in the above area
Westland Province, a province of New Zealand from 1873–76

United States 
Westland, Indiana
Westland, Putnam County, Indiana
Westland, Michigan
Westland, Oregon; see McKay Reservoir
Westland, Pennsylvania
Westland, Virginia
Westland Mall (Hialeah), a shopping mall in Hialeah, Florida
Westland Mansion, the retirement home of U.S. president Grover Cleveland
Westland Middle School, in Bethesda, Maryland

Aircraft
Westland Aircraft, a British aircraft manufacturer, which merged and became:
Westland Helicopters, a British helicopter manufacturer, in 1961
AgustaWestland, a British/Italian helicopter manufacturer, following a further merger in 2000
Westland affair, a 1986 British political crisis stemming from the government's ownership of Westland Aircraft

Other
Westland (Nazi propaganda), the planned Nazi German name for the occupied Netherlands, or the unit of Dutch SS soldiers in Russia
Westland School (disambiguation)
The Westland, a Western Australian named train service
The Westland (periodical), an Australian railway magazine published by Rail Heritage WA
Westland Books

See also
 West Country
 Vestlandet or Western Norway